Conor Allis (born 8 March 1990) is an Irish hurler who played as a Centre-forward for the Limerick senior team. Allis made his senior championship debut for Limerick against Tipperary on 27 May 2012 in a 1-19 to 2-20 defeat at Semple Stadium, scoring two points in the game.

Honours
Limerick
Munster Senior Hurling Championship (1): 2013
Munster Under-21 Hurling Championship (1): 2011

References

Living people
1990 births
Croom hurlers
Limerick inter-county hurlers